Jajarm County is in North Khorasan province, Iran. The capital of the county is the city of Jajarm. At the 2006 census, the county's population was 57,349, in 14,803 households. The following census in 2011 counted 36,898 people in 10,532 households, by which time parts of the Central District had been separated from the county to form Garmeh County. At the 2016 census, the county's population was 36,673 in 11,154 households.

Administrative divisions

The population history and structural changes of Jajarm County's administrative divisions over three consecutive censuses are shown in the following table. The latest census shows three districts, five rural districts, and three cities.

References

Jajarm County| 

Counties of North Khorasan Province